Yengejeh is a village in Kuhestan Rural District, Qaleh Chay District, Ajab Shir County, East Azerbaijan Province, Iran. At the 2006 census, its population was 858, in 199 families.

References 

Populated places in Ajab Shir County